John G. Jackson may refer to:

John G. Jackson (politician) (1777–1825), U.S Representative and federal judge from Virginia
John G. Jackson (writer) (1907–1993), African-American cultural historian and writer

See also
John Jackson (disambiguation)